Bugovina is a village in the municipality of Trebinje, Republika Srpska, Bosnia and Herzegovina.

References

Populated places in Trebinje